Lesbian, gay, bisexual, and transgender (LGBT) persons in North Macedonia face legal and social challenges not experienced by non-LGBT residents. Both male and female same-sex sexual activity have been legal in North Macedonia since 1996, but same-sex couples and households headed by same-sex couples are not eligible for the same legal protections available to opposite-sex married couples.

In 2019, ILGA-Europe ranked North Macedonia 34th out of 49 European countries in terms of LGBT rights legislation.

Legality of same-sex sexual activity
Homosexuality was outlawed in North Macedonia until 1996, when the country decriminalized sex between people of the same sex as a condition for becoming a member of the Council of Europe.

Recognition of same-sex relationships
There is no legal recognition of same-sex couples. The family law defines marriage as "a union between a man and a woman".

In September 2013, a proposed constitutional amendment to define marriage as a union between a man and a woman failed to meet the required two-thirds majority in the Assembly of North Macedonia. In late June 2014, the re-elected main party once again submitted the bill, this time hoping that the conservative opposition party, the Democratic Party of Albanians (DPA), would provide the additional votes needed to pass.

In January 2015, Parliament voted in favour to constitutionally define marriage as a union solely between a man and a woman. In addition, politicians adopted an amendment to ensure that a two-thirds majority would be necessary to regulate marriage, family and civil unions. Such a majority was previously reserved only for issues such as sovereignty and territorial questions. On 9 January, the parliamentary committee on constitutional issues approved a series of amendments, including the limitation of marriage and the two-thirds majority requirement which was included at the last minute. On 20 January, the amendments were approved in Parliament by 72 votes to 4. In order for these amendments to be added to the Constitution, a final vote was required. This final parliamentary session was commenced on 26 January but never concluded, as the ruling coalition did not obtain the two-thirds majority required. The parliamentary session on the constitutional amendments was in recess until the end of 2015, thus the amendment failed.

Discrimination protections
From 2008 to 2010, LGB individuals were protected from discrimination in the area of employment. In the beginning of 2010, however, while revising the anti-discrimination law, the country's Parliament removed sexual orientation from the list of protected grounds.

In March 2019, with 52 votes in favour and three abstentions, the Parliament adopted a new anti-discrimination law that includes sexual orientation and gender identity, among other grounds. On 22 May, the Law on Prevention of and Protection against Discrimination came into effect, after newly elected President Stevo Pendarovski had signed it into law. On 14 May 2020, the Constitutional Court struck down the law on procedural grounds. A similar bill was passed by the Parliament on 27 October 2020.

Gender identity and expression
In January 2019, the European Court of Human Rights (ECHR) ruled that North Macedonia's requirement that transgender people undergo sex reassignment surgery before their gender marker on ID documents can be changed is a violation of human rights. The judgment held that deficiencies in North Macedonia's laws concerning modifying gender on official identification documents infringed the private life of transgender Macedonians.

Living conditions
The gay scene in North Macedonia is very small. There are a few gay-friendly establishments in Skopje and some bars organize "gay nights". The country itself is mainly socially conservative towards homosexuality. There are many reports about public humiliations, worker firings and even casting homosexual teenagers onto the streets due to revelation of their sexual orientations.

In 2019, North Macedonia was ranked the tenth worst European country for LGBT tourists.

On 29 June 2019, an estimated 1,000 people participated in the first Skopje Pride. Some state officials joined the march, including Defense Minister Radmila Šekerinska and Labor and Social Issues Minister Mila Carovska. Several foreign diplomats also attended the march.

Public opinion
A survey carried out in 2002 by the Center for Civil and Human Rights showed that more than 80% of the people saw homosexuality as "a psychiatric disorder that endangered families". About 65% answered that "being gay is a crime that warranted a jail term."

Women are generally more liberal in their attitudes towards homosexuality than men and rural inhabitants.

LGBT rights organizations
There are three main organizations and a support center working in the area of LGBT rights:

 LGBT United (Macedonian: ЛГБТ Јунајтед) is a recently formed organization which works exclusively for protecting LGBT rights in the country. It organized the first ever pride week in Skopje in late June 2013 alongside the Coalition "Sexual and Health Rights of Marginalized Communities". The programme mainly included the airing of LGBT-themed films.
 EGAL (Macedonian: ЕГАЛ) is the oldest organization working in the area of gay/lesbian health issues. It's also one of the main supporters of the Dzunitsa film festival, which shows LGBT-themed films.
 Coalition "Sexual and Health Rights of Marginalized Communities" (Macedonian: Коалиција „Сексуални и здравствени права на маргинализираните заедници“) works partially in the LGBT rights area and organizes different events for promoting equality. It worked on organizing the Skopje Pride Week in 2013.
 LGBTI Support Center (Macedonian: ЛГБТИ Центар за поддршка) is a subsidiary of the Helsinki Committee for Human Rights of the Republic of Macedonia located in Skopje that works on changing the legal and social status of the LGBT people in North Macedonia through community strengthening, advocacy and free legal aid.

Country Reports on Human Rights Practices for 2019
According to United States' Country Reports on Human Rights Practices for North Macedonia in 2019, the LGBT community is still prejudiced and harassed by the society, media and the authorities despite increasing tolerance. The constitution and law prohibit discrimination based on sexual orientation in housing, employment, nationality laws, and access to government services such as health care, and the government enforced such laws. The report stated:

Summary table

See also

Human rights in North Macedonia
LGBT rights in Europe
LGBT history in Yugoslavia

Notes

External links
 
 
 
 

 
Law of North Macedonia
Human rights in North Macedonia
North Macedonia